Generation 2000 (G2K) is the young professional affiliate of the Jamaica Labour Party (JLP). It is a Center-Right political Youth Organization that was founded in 2000 by a group of young professionals that saw a need for professional politics in Jamaica. The organization was incorporated as a corporate non-profit body, with a Board of Directors chaired by Dr. David Panton in the year 2000. The current President of Generation 2000 is Ryan Strachan, a Stockbroker, who is a graduate of London Southbank University.

Presidents of Generation 2000 typically become Members of Parliament, Senators and Constituency Caretakers in Government of Jamaica.

References

Political youth organizations
Political parties in Jamaica
Political parties established in 2000